Petach may refer to:
 23011 Petach, a main-belt asteroid, named after Intel Science Talent Search finalist Helen Petach
 Petach Tikva Pioneers, an Israeli baseball team 
 Petah Tikva (unofficial name: Petach Tikvah), a city in Israel
 Hapoel Petah Tikva F.C., an Israeli football club